Shaughnessy Bishop-Stall is a Canadian journalist, best known for his 2004 book Down to This: Squalor and Splendour in a Big-City Shantytown. The book describes a period in Bishop-Stall's life during which he voluntarily gave up his old life and spent a year living in Toronto's Tent City.

A graduate of Concordia University, he has written for Saturday Night, Utne Reader, the National Post and The Globe and Mail. He instructs creative writing classes for the University of Toronto's School of Continuing Studies. He also appeared in the third season of the CBC Television sitcom The Newsroom, playing a newswriter.

Works
 Down to This: Squalor and Splendour in a Big-City Shantytown, 2004 
 Ghosted, 2010 
 Hungover: A History of the Morning After and One Man's Quest for the Cure, 2018

Reviews of Down to This
 Sydney Morning Herald

References

Year of birth missing (living people)
Living people
Canadian male journalists
Canadian male non-fiction writers
21st-century Canadian journalists